Real Grupo de Cultura Covadonga is a handball team in Gijón, Asturias. Spain, that plays in División de Plata, the second tier in the Spanish handball.

History
Grupo Covadonga played the top league from the 1976–77 to the 1979–80, after winning the promotion playoff to BM Gavà on May 10, 1976. Years later, in 2001, it achieved a vacant berth in the División de Plata, second tier, and was very close to promote to Liga ASOBAL. After several tries, Grupo Covadonga decreased its level and was relegated to Primera Nacional.

In 2015, despite failing for the second time in a row to promote, Grupo Covadonga returned to División de Plata after taking the spot of the reserve team of BM Granollers. Three years later, the club resigned and sold its place to BM Villa de Aranda.

Season by season

Notable players
 Alberto Entrerríos
 Raúl Entrerríos
 Juan de la Puente
 Carlos Ruesga

References

External links
Handball section at RGCC website

Handball
Grupo